Lauri Carlson (born 1952) is a linguist and Professor of Linguistics and Translation at the University of Helsinki. He is known for his works on translation, terminology and general applications of computational linguistics.

Bibliography

References 

Living people
1952 births
Academic staff of the University of Helsinki
Computational linguistics researchers
Terminologists